Drotningsvik is a neighbourhood in the city of Bergen, Norway.  It is located west of the village of Loddefjord in the borough of Laksevåg.

References

Neighbourhoods of Bergen